Carlos Gimeno Valero (born 25 June 2001) is a Spanish tennis player.

Gimeno Valero has a career high ATP singles ranking of World No. 260 achieved on 9 August 2021. He also has a career high doubles ranking of World No. 1508 achieved on 2 December 2019.

Juniors
As a junior, Gimeno Valero reached his highest ranking of No. 12 in the world, in the combined singles and doubles junior ranking system. This was highlighted by a runner-up finish at the 2019 Wimbledon where he was defeated in the championship match by Japanese player Shintaro Mochizuki in straight sets 3–6, 2–6.

Junior Grand Slam finals

Singles: 1 (1 runner-up)

Career
Gimeno Valero has reached four career ITF singles finals winning all of them for a record of 4-0, which includes winning one ATP Challenger title, the Gran Canaria 2 Challenger in March 2021, where he defeated Belgian Kimmer Coppejans 6–4, 6–2 in the final.

He managed to win in the first round of qualifying at the 2021 Barcelona Open by defeating Mikhail Kukushkin 6–1, 6–2 but would go on to lose in the second round to Tallon Griekspoor 7–6(7–4), 6–7(4–7), 3–6.

ATP Challenger and ITF World Tennis Tour Finals

Singles: 4 (4–0)

References

External links
 
 

2001 births
Living people
Spanish male tennis players
Sportspeople from Valencia
Tennis players from the Valencian Community